Material Girl is a British romantic comedy produced by Carnival Films, that first aired on BBC One on 14 January 2010. It stars Lenora Crichlow, Dervla Kirwan, and Michael Landes.

Set in the fashion world, it was inspired by the book Fashion Babylon. It was described in one of the early promotional items as "a romantic comedy about a young fashion designer battling an evil ex-boss, a sexy-but-devilish business partner and snobby fashionistas to get her break in work and love".

Cast
Lenora Crichlow – Ali Redcliffe, a young fashion designer attempting to make a name for herself
Dervla Kirwan – Davina Bailey, the current hot designer, who is not about to allow an upstart like Ali take her spotlight
Michael Landes – Marco Keriliak, fashion businessman, Ali's business partner
O. T. Fagbenle – Chris, motorcycle courier and Ali's ex-boyfriend
Nick Blood – Alex, Davina's fashion assistant, Ali's friend and gay flatmate
Ingrid Oliver – Mimi Throckmorton, Ali's friend, stockist at a fashion magazine-cum stylist
Anna Brewster – Lydia Kane, supermodel and Ali's friend
Esther Smith – Trish, Ali's studio receptionist
Joanna Kanska – Dorota, Ali's studio dressmaker
Malcolm Sinclair – Mitchell Crompton, leading fashion critic
Sadie Pickering – Louise, works for fashion magazine
Lindsey Coulson – Christina Redcliffe, Ali's mother
Anthony Calf – Anthony Chatsworth, an influential fashion magazine editor, had affair with Mimi
Charlie Carter – Paparazzi, stitches up Lydia Kane for Mitchell

Episodes
Series 1 began on 14 January 2010 on BBC One. There were 6 episodes in total. The series also aired on BBC HD, with a late repeat the same night on BBC Three.

Reception
The first episode gained 3 million viewers with a 12% audience share, which fell to 2.6 million (11% share) for the third episode.

Critical reviews of the series based on the pilot were mixed, with the London Evening Standard calling it a "jaw-droppingly, buttock-clenchingly dreadful pieces of television". Reviewing the first episode for The Guardian, Sam Wollaston said: "OK, it's silly and deeply shallow. It's also gorgeous, fizzy, bitchy, self-indulgent, obviously bad for you but dangerously addictive. Careful, Material Girl could become a habit."

DVD release
The first series was released in the United Kingdom on DVD on 22 February 2010.

References

External links

BBC television dramas
2010s British drama television series
2010 British television series debuts
2010 British television series endings
Fashion-themed television series
2010s British romantic comedy television series
2010s British television miniseries
English-language television shows